The Douglas DC-8 (sometimes McDonnell Douglas DC-8) is a long-range narrow-body airliner built by the American Douglas Aircraft Company.

After losing the May 1954 US Air Force tanker competition to the Boeing KC-135, Douglas announced in July 1955 its derived jetliner project.
In October 1955, Pan Am made the first order along with the competing Boeing 707, and many other airlines followed.
The first DC-8 was rolled out in Long Beach Airport on April 9, 1958, and flew for the first time on May 30.
FAA certification was achieved in August 1959 and the DC-8 entered service with Delta Air Lines on September 18.

The DC-8-10 was powered by Pratt & Whitney JT3C turbojets and had a  MTOW, the DC-8-20 had more powerful JT4A turbojets for a  MTOW.
The intercontinental models had more fuel capacity and up to  MTOW, powered by JT4As for the Series 30 and by Rolls-Royce Conway turbofans for the Series 40.

The improved Series 60 was announced in April 1965.
It first flew on March 14, 1966, was certified on September 2, 1966, and entered service with United Airlines in February 1967. 
The DC-8-63 had the long fuselage and the enlarged wing, freighters MTOW reached .

The DC-8 was produced until 1972 with 556 aircraft built. It was superseded by larger wide-body airliners including Douglas' DC-10.
In 1975, the Series 70 retrofit was proposed with the quieter and more fuel-efficient CFM56 turbofan.
Some re-engined freighters are still in use.

Development

Background 
After World War II Douglas was the dominant aircraft builder in the commercial aviation market. Although Boeing had released the innovative all-metal Model 247 airliner in 1933, and produced prodigious quantities of the rugged four-engined B-17 and sophisticated, pressurized long-range B-29, Douglas, more than any other aircraft builder, defined the postwar aviation industry. Douglas produced a succession of piston-engined aircraft (DC-2, DC-3, DC-4, DC-5, DC-6, and DC-7) through the 1930s, 1940s, and 1950s. When de Havilland flew the first jet airliner, the Comet, in 1949, Douglas initially refrained from developing a jet airliner.

De Havilland's pioneering Comet entered airline service in 1952. Initially, it was a success, but it was grounded in 1954 after two fatal accidents which were subsequently attributed to rapid metal fatigue failure of the pressure cabin. Aircraft builders gained considerable benefit from the Comet groundings which resulted in significant attention to detail in the design of the DC-8 pressure cabin. In 1952, Douglas remained the most successful of the commercial aircraft manufacturers. The company had received almost 300 orders for the piston-engine DC-6 and its successor, the DC-7, which had yet to fly. The Comet disasters, and the airlines' subsequent lack of interest in jets, seemed to validate the decision to remain with propeller-driven aircraft.

Competition 
Boeing took the bold step of starting to plan a pure-jet airliner as early as 1949. Boeing's military arm had gained experience with large, long-range jets through the B-47 Stratojet (first flight 1947) and the B-52 Stratofortress (1952). With thousands of jet bombers on order or in service, Boeing had developed a close relationship with the US Air Force's Strategic Air Command (SAC). Boeing also supplied the SAC's refueling aircraft, the piston-engined KC-97 Stratofreighters, but these were too slow and low flying to easily work with the new jet bombers. The B-52, in particular, had to descend from its cruising altitude and then slow almost to stall speed to work with the KC-97.

Believing that a requirement for a jet-powered tanker was a certainty, Boeing started work on a new jet aircraft for this role that could be adapted into an airliner. As an airliner, it would have similar seating capacity to the Comet, but its swept wing would give it higher cruising speed and better range. First presented in 1950 as the Model 473-60C, Boeing failed to generate any interest from the airlines. Boeing remained convinced that the project was worthwhile, and decided to press ahead with a prototype, the Boeing 367-80 ("Dash-80"). After spending $16 million of its own money on construction, the Dash-80 rolled out on May 15, 1954, and flew the next month. Boeing's plans became obvious, despite the misleading older model number.

Early design phase 

Douglas secretly began jet transport project definition studies in mid-1952.

Douglas remained lukewarm about the jet airliner project but believed that the Air Force tanker contract would go to two companies for two different aircraft, as several USAF transport contracts in the past had done. In May 1954, the USAF circulated its requirement for 800 jet tankers to Boeing, Douglas, Convair, Fairchild, Lockheed, and Martin. Boeing was just two months away from having its prototype in the air. Just four months after issuing the tanker requirement, the USAF ordered the first 29 KC-135s from Boeing. Besides Boeing's ability to provide a jet tanker promptly, the flying-boom air-to-air refueling system was also a Boeing product from the KC-97.

Donald Douglas was shocked by the rapidity of the decision which, he said, had been made before the competing companies even had time to complete their bids. He protested to Washington, but without success. Having started on the DC-8 project, Douglas decided that it was better to press on than give up. This led to larger wings and tail surfaces and a longer fuselage. The DC-8 was announced in July 1955. Douglas steadfastly refused to offer different fuselage sizes. The maiden flight was planned for December 1957, with entry into revenue service in 1959. Well aware that they were lagging behind Boeing, Douglas began a major marketing push.

First orders 
Douglas' previous thinking about the airliner market seemed to be coming true; the transition to turbine power looked likely to be to turboprops rather than turbojets. The pioneering 40–60-seat Vickers Viscount was in service and proving popular with passengers and airlines: it was faster, quieter, and more comfortable than piston-engined types. Another British rival was the 90-seat Bristol Britannia, and Douglas's main rival in the large airliner market, Lockheed, had committed to the short to medium range 80–100-seat turboprop Electra, with a launch order from American Airlines for 35 and other orders flowing in. Meanwhile, the Comet remained grounded, the French 90-passenger twin jet Sud Aviation Caravelle prototype had just flown for the first time, and the 707 was not expected to be available until late 1958. The major airlines were reluctant to commit themselves to the huge financial and technical challenges of jet aircraft. However, no one could afford not to buy jets if their competitors did.

There the matter rested until October 1955, when Pan American World Airways placed simultaneous orders with Boeing for 20 707s and Douglas for 25 DC-8s. To buy one expensive and untried jet-powered aircraft type was brave: to buy both was, at the time, unheard of. In the closing months of 1955, other airlines rushed to follow suit: Air France, American Airlines, Braniff International Airways, Continental Airlines, and Sabena ordered 707s; United Airlines, National Airlines, KLM, Eastern Air Lines, Japan Air Lines, and Scandinavian Airlines System (SAS) chose the DC-8. In 1956, Air India, BOAC, Lufthansa, Qantas, and TWA added over 50 to the 707 order book, while Douglas sold 22 DC-8s to Delta, Swissair, TAI, Trans Canada, and UAT. By the start of 1958, Douglas had sold 133 DC-8s compared to Boeing's 150 707s.

Production and testing 

Donald Douglas proposed to build and test the DC-8 at Santa Monica Airport, which had been the birthplace of the DC-3 and home to a Douglas plant that employed 44,000 workers during World War II. To accommodate the new jet, Douglas asked the city of Santa Monica, California to lengthen the airport's 5,000-foot runway. Following complaints by neighboring residents, the city refused, so Douglas moved its airliner production line to Long Beach Airport. The first DC-8 N8008D was rolled out of the new Long Beach factory on 9 April 1958 and flew for the first time, in Series 10 form, on 30 May for two hours seven minutes with the crew being led by A.G. Heimerdinger.

Later that year an enlarged version of the Comet finally returned to service, but too late to take a substantial portion of the market: de Havilland had just 25 orders. In August Boeing had begun delivering 707s to Pan Am. Douglas made a massive effort to close the gap with Boeing, using no fewer than ten aircraft for flight testing to achieve FAA certification for the first of the many DC-8 variants in August 1959. Much needed to be done: the original air brakes on the lower rear fuselage were found ineffective and were deleted as engine thrust reversers had become available; unique leading-edge slots were added to improve low-speed lift; the prototype was 25 kn (46 km/h) short of its promised cruising speed and a new, slightly larger wingtip had to be developed to reduce drag. Also, a recontoured wing leading edge was later developed to extend the chord 4% and reduce drag at high Mach numbers.

On August 21, 1961, a Douglas DC-8 broke the sound barrier at Mach 1.012 (660 mph/1,062 km/h) while in a controlled dive through  and maintained that speed for 16 seconds. The flight was to collect data on a new leading-edge design for the wing, and, while doing so, the DC-8 became the first civilian jet – and the first jet airliner – to make a supersonic flight. The aircraft was DC-8-43 registered as CF-CPG, later delivered to Canadian Pacific Air Lines. The aircraft, crewed by Captain William Magruder, First Officer Paul Patten, Flight Engineer Joseph Tomich and Flight Test Engineer Richard Edwards, took off from Edwards Air Force Base in California and was accompanied to altitude by a F-104 Starfighter supersonic chase aircraft flown by Chuck Yeager.

Entry into service 

On September 18, 1959, the DC-8 entered service with Delta Air Lines and United Airlines. According to the Delta Air Lines website, the air carrier was the first to operate the DC-8 in scheduled passenger service. By March 1960, Douglas had reached its planned production rate of eight DC-8s a month. Despite a large number of DC-8 early models available, all used the same basic airframe, differing only in engines, weights and details; in contrast, the rival Boeing 707 range offered several fuselage lengths and two wingspans: the original  707-120, a  version that sacrificed space to gain longer range, and the stretched 707-320, which at  overall had  more cabin space than the DC-8. Douglas' refusal to offer different fuselage sizes made it less adaptable and forced Delta and United to look elsewhere for short to medium range types. Delta ordered Convair 880s, and United chose the newly developed short-fuselage 707-020. United prevailed on Boeing to rename the new variant the Boeing 720 in case the public thought they were dissatisfied with the DC-8. Pan Am never reordered the DC-8 and Douglas gradually lost market share to Boeing. In 1962, DC-8 sales dropped to just 26, followed by 21 in 1963 and 14 in 1964; many were for the Jet Trader rather than the more-prestigious passenger versions. In 1967, Douglas merged with McDonnell Aircraft, becoming McDonnell Douglas.

Further developments 

In April 1965, Douglas announced belated fuselage stretches for the DC-8 with three new models known as the Super Sixties. The DC-8 program had been in danger of closing with fewer than 300 aircraft sold, but the Super Sixties brought fresh life to it. By the time production ceased in 1972, 262 of the stretched DC-8s had been made. With the ability to seat 269 passengers, the DC-8 Series 61 and 63 had the largest passenger-carrying capacity available. That remained so until the Boeing 747 arrived in 1970. The DC-8-62 featured a shorter fuselage when compared with the Series 61 and 63, but was capable of nonstop long-range operations.

All the earlier jetliners were noisy by modern standards. Increasing traffic densities and changing public attitudes led to complaints about aircraft noise and moves to introduce restrictions. As early as 1966 the Port Authority of New York and New Jersey expressed concern about the noise to be expected from the then still-unbuilt DC-8-61, and operators had to agree to operate it from New York at lower weights to reduce noise. By the early 1970s, legislation for aircraft noise standards was being introduced in many countries, and the 60 Series DC-8s were particularly at risk of being banned from major airports.

In the early 1970s, several airlines approached McDonnell Douglas for noise reduction modifications to the DC-8, but nothing was done. Third parties had developed aftermarket hushkits but there was no real move to keep the DC-8 in service. Finally, in 1975, General Electric began discussions with major airlines to fit the new and vastly-quieter Franco-American CFM56 engine to both DC-8s and 707s. MDC remained reluctant but eventually came on board in the late 1970s and helped develop the Series 70.

The Super Seventies were a great success: roughly 70% quieter than the 60 Series and, at the time of their introduction, the world's quietest four-engined airliner. As well as being quieter and more powerful, the CFM56 was up to 23% more fuel-efficient than the JT3D, which reduced operating costs and extended the range.

By 2002, of the 1,032 Boeing 707s and 720s manufactured for commercial use, just 80 remained in service – though many of those 707s were converted for USAF use, either in service or for spare parts. Of the 556 DC-8s made, around 200 were still in commercial service in 2002, including about 25 50-Series, 82 of the stretched 60-Series, and 96 out of the 110 re-engined 70-Series. Most of the surviving DC-8s are now used as freighters. In May 2009, 97 DC-8s were in service following UPS's decision to retire its remaining fleet of 44. In January 2013, an estimated 36 DC-8s were in use worldwide. As a result of aging, increasing operating costs and strict noise and emissions regulations, the number of active DC-8s continues to decline, with the youngest airframes nearing a half-century of age.

Variants

Series 10 

For domestic use, powered by 13,500 lb (60.5 kN) Pratt & Whitney JT3C-6 turbojets with water injection. The initial DC-8-11 model had the original wingtips used on the prototype, and all remaining DC-8 Series 10 aircraft were upgraded to DC-8-12 standard. The DC-8-12 featured the new low-drag wingtips and leading-edge slots, 80 inches long between the engines on each wing and 34 inches long inboard of the inner engines. These unique devices were covered by doors on the upper and lower wing surfaces that opened for low-speed flight and closed for cruise. This model was originally named "DC-8A" until the series 30 was introduced. 30 DC-8-10s were built: 23 for United and 6 for Delta, plus the prototype. By the mid-sixties, United had converted 16 of its 21 surviving aircraft to DC-8-20 standard and the other 5 to -50s. Delta converted its 6 to DC-8-50s. (The prototype was itself also converted to a DC-8-50.)

Series 20 

This model was originally named "DC-8B" but was renamed when the series 30 was introduced.

Series 30 
For intercontinental routes, the three Series 30 variants combined JT4A engines with a one-third increase in fuel capacity and strengthened fuselage and landing gear. The DC-8-31 was certified in March 1960 with 16,800 lb (75.2 kN) JT4A-9 engines for  maximum takeoff weight. The DC-8-32 was similar but allowed  weight. The DC-8-33 of November 1960 substituted 17,500 lb (78.4 kN) JT4A-11 turbojets, a modification to the flap linkage to allow a 1.5° setting for more efficient cruise, stronger landing gear, and  maximum weight. Many -31 and -32 DC-8s were upgraded to this standard. A total of 57 DC-8-30s were produced (five of which were later upgraded to DC-8-50 standard).

Series 40 

The DC-8-40 was essentially the -30 but with 17,500 lb (78.4 kN) Rolls-Royce Conway 509 turbofan engines for better efficiency, less noise and less smoke. The Conway was an improvement over the turbojets that preceded it, but the Series 40 sold poorly because of the traditional reluctance of U.S. airlines to buy a foreign product and because the still-more-advanced Pratt & Whitney JT3D turbofan was due in early 1961. It was used on all later DC-8s. The first DC-8-40 was delivered in 1960; 32 were built (of which three would eventually be converted to DC-8-50s).

Series 50 

The definitive short-fuselage DC-8 came with the same engine that powered the vast majority of 707s, the JT3D. Twenty earlier DC-8s were converted to this standard. All but the -55 were certified in 1961. The DC-8-51, DC-8-52 and DC-8-53 all had 17,000 lb (76.1 kN) JT3D-1 or 18,000 lb (80.6 kN) JT3D-3B engines, varying mainly in their weights: ,  and  respectively. The DC-8-55 arrived in June 1964, retaining the JT3D-3B engines but with strengthened structure from the freighter versions and  maximum weight. 142 DC-8-50s were built plus the 20 converted from Series 10/30/40.

 DC-8 Jet Trader: Douglas approved the development of freighter versions of the DC-8 in May 1961, based on the Series 50. An original plan to fit a fixed bulkhead separating the forward  of the cabin for freight, leaving the rear cabin for 54 passenger seats was soon replaced by a more practical one to use a movable bulkhead and allow anywhere between 25 and 114 seats with the remainder set aside for cargo. Airlines could order a windowless cabin but only United did, ordering 15 in 1964. Both used 18,000 lb (80.6 kN) JT3D-3B powerplants. 62 aircraft built (plus one converted from a standard DC-8-50 and two of the three converted DC-8-40s).
 EC-24A: A single former United Airlines DC-8-54 (F) was used by the United States Navy as an electronic warfare training platform. It was retired in October 1998 and is now in storage with the 309th Aerospace Maintenance and Regeneration Group.

Super 60 Series 

 DC-8 Series 61: The "Super DC-8" Series 61 was designed for high capacity and medium range. It had the same wings, engines and pylons as the -55, and sacrificed range to gain capacity. The added length required strengthening of the structure, but the basic DC-8 design already had sufficient ground clearance to permit the one-third increase in cabin size without requiring longer landing gear. Deliveries began in January 1967 and it entered service with United Airlines in February 1967. It typically carried 180–220 passengers in mixed-class configuration, or 259 in high-density configuration. A cargo door equipped DC-8-61CF was also available. 78 -61s and 10 -61CFs were built.
 DC-8 Series 62: The long-range Series 62 followed in April 1967. The 18,000 lb JT3D-3B was retained but the engine pylons were redesigned to eliminate their protrusion above the wing and make them sweep forward more sharply, so that the engines were some  further forward. The changes all improved the aircraft's aerodynamic efficiency. Also available as the cargo door equipped convertible  or all cargo . Production included 51 DC-8-62s, 10 , and 6 .
 DC-8 Series 63: The "Super DC-8" Series 63 was the final new-build variant and entered service in June 1968. Eastern Air Lines bought six  with the strengthened floor of the freighters but no cargo door. Production included 41 DC-8-63s, 53 , 7 , and 6 . The Flying Tiger Line was a major early customer for the DC-8-63F.

Super 70 Series 

The DC-8-71, DC-8-72, and DC-8-73 were straightforward conversions of the -61, -62 and -63 primarily involving the replacement of the JT3D engines with more fuel-efficient 22,000 lb (98.5 kN) CFM56-2 high-bypass turbofans with new nacelles and pylons built by Grumman Aerospace and fairing of the air intakes below the nose. The DC-8-71 achieved the same end but required more modification because the -61 did not have the improved wings and relocated engines of the -62 and -63. Maximum takeoff weights remained the same, but there was a slight reduction in payload because of the heavier engines. All three models were certified in 1982 and a total of 110 60-Series DC-8s were converted by the time the program ended in 1988. DC-8-70 conversions were overseen by Cammacorp with CFMI, McDonnell Douglas, and Grumman Aerospace as partners. Cammacorp was disbanded after the last aircraft was converted.

Operators 

, five DC-8s remain in commercial service, including two by Skybus Jet Cargo, a Peruvian cargo airline. Trans Air Cargo of the Republic of the Congo is listed as having three active DC-8s with 9S-AJG, a DC-8-62, having been seen flying as recently as April 2021. However, 9Q-CJL, despite being listed as active, has had no photographic or flight tracking evidence appear since at least 2009. Disaster relief organization Samaritan's Purse operates a DC-8-72 Combi. NASA operated one DC-8-72 for research including archaeology, ecology, geography, hydrology, meteorology, oceanography, volcanology, atmospheric chemistry, cryospheric science, soil science, and biology projects until January 2023. This aircraft, registered as N817NA, was retired in early January 2023 in favor of NASA purchasing an ex-Japan Air Lines Boeing 777-200ER to replace the DC-8.

Accidents and incidents 

, the DC-8 had been involved in 146 incidents, including 84 hull-loss accidents, with 2,255 fatalities. The DC-8 has also been involved in 46 hijackings with 2 fatalities. The deadliest incident involving the DC-8 was Nigeria Airways Flight 2120 which crashed on July 11, 1991, with 261 fatalities.

Aircraft on display 
The following museums have DC-8s on display or in storage:
 The forward section of a DC-8-32 operated by Japan Airlines, Fuji, is on display at Haneda Airport, Tokyo. The first jet airliner used by the airline, it was retired from service in 1974 for use as a cockpit trainer.
 45280 – DC-8-21 on display at the Chinese Aviation Museum in Datangshan, China. It is an ex-United Airlines aircraft formerly used as a flying eye hospital by ORBIS International.
 45570 – DC-8-33 on display at the Musée de l'Air at the Paris–Le Bourget Airport in Paris, France. It is an ex-French Air Force electronic warfare aircraft and has been on display since its retirement in 2001.
 45850 – DC-8-52 on display at the California Science Center in Exposition Park, Los Angeles, California. It is an ex-United Airlines aircraft and is on display outside near Downtown LA.
 45922 – DC-8-62CF on display at the Naval Air Museum Barbers Point at Kalaeloa Airport in Kapolei, Hawaii since 2013, ex- Air Transport International.
 46160 – DC-8-61 on display at the Shanghai Aerospace Enthusiasts Centre, ex-Japan Airlines.
 There is a DC-8 displayed at Kenneth Kaunda International Airport in Lusaka Zambia. It was operated as a cargo plane by MK Airlines.

Specifications

Deliveries

See also

Notes

References

Further reading 
 Cearley, George Walker. The Douglas DC-8: A Pictorial History. Dallas: G.W. Cearley Jr., 1992.
 Douglas Aircraft Co. The DC-8 Story. Long Beach, CA: Douglas Aircraft Company, 1972.
 Douglas Aircraft Co. Douglas DC-8 Maintenance Manual. Long Beach, CA: Douglas Aircraft Company, 1959. OCLC 10621428.
 Hubler, Richard G. Big Eight: A Biography of an Airplane. New York: Duell, Sloan, and Pearce, 1960.
 Lundkvist, Bo-Goran. Douglas DC-8. Coral Springs, FL: Lundkvist Aviation Research, 1983. OCLC 62220710.
 McDonnell-Douglas. The DC-8 Super-Sixty. Long Beach, CA: McDonnell Douglas Corp. Sales Engineering Div., 1968.
 McDonnell-Douglas. The DC-8 Handbook. Long Beach, CA: McDonnell Douglas Corp. Sales Engineering Div., 1982.
 Proctor, Jon, Machat, Mike, Kodeta, Craig. From Props to Jets: Commercial Aviatin's Transition to the Jet Age 1952–1962. North Branch, MN: Specialty Press. .
 Vicenzi, Ugo. Early American Jetliners: Boeing 707, Douglas DC-8 and Convair CV880. Osceola, WI: MBI Publishing. .
 Waddington, Terry. Douglas DC-8. Miami, FL: World Transport Press, 1996. .
 Wilson, Stewart. Airliners of the World. Fyshwick, Australia, ACT: Aerospace Publications Pty Ltd., 1999. .
 Wilson, Stewart. Boeing 707, Douglas DC-8, and Vickers VC-10. Fyshwick, Australia, ACT: Aerospace Publications Pty Ltd., 1998. .

External links 

 
 Boeing: Historical Snapshot: DC-8 Commercial Transport
 McDonnell Douglas commercial history page for DC-8 series
 

 
DC-08
DC-08
1950s United States airliners
Quadjets
Low-wing aircraft
Aircraft first flown in 1958